Deep Space is a coaster ride at the Adlabs Imagica amusement park located in Khopoli, Maharashtra, India. Manufactured by Premier rides, the ride reaches a maximum height of 57 feet (17.5 m) and a maximum speed of 42.50 miles per hour (68.4 km/h).
The coaster also features 2 inversions.

History 
The dark indoor coaster was launched by Varun Dhawan with a mysterious Astronaut.

Characteristics

Track 
Designed by Premier Rides, the steel rail roller coaster of Deep Space is approximately 1706 feet (520 m) long and 57 feet (17.5 m) high. The track is painted black with grey rails and black supports.

Trains 
Deep Space operates with two steel and fiberglass trains. Each train has two cars with 3 rows that can seat two riders in a single row, for a total of 12 riders per train.

Reception 
Neha Borkar from the Indiatimes said,"This one turned out to be the most surprising ride as we did the swiftest time travel in the space. Stick your neck tightly to the seat, as the speed here is neck breaking."

References

External links 
 

Steel roller coasters
Roller coasters introduced in 2013
Tourist attractions in Maharashtra
Roller coasters in India
Outer space in amusement parks